The 22nd Annual Gotham Independent Film Awards, presented by the Independent Filmmaker Project, were held on November 26, 2012. The nominees were announced on October 18, 2012. The ceremony was hosted by Mike Birbiglia.

During the award ceremony, host Mike Birbiglia roasted Russell by reading a transcript of Russell's argument with Lily Tomlin that occurred on the set of I Heart Huckabees. The event, specifically the joke and what that transpired around it, later formed a large part of Birbiglia's show, Thank God for Jokes.

Winners and nominees
{| class="wikitable" role="presentation"
| style="vertical-align:top; width:50%;"| 
 Moonrise Kingdom
 Bernie
 The Loneliest Planet
 The Master
 Middle of Nowhere
| style="vertical-align:top; width:50%;"| 
 How to Survive a Plague
 Detropia
 Marina Abramovic: The Artist is Present
 Room 237
 The Waiting Room
|-
| style="vertical-align:top; width:50%;"| 
 Benh Zeitlin – Beasts of the Southern Wild
 Zal Batmanglij – Sound of My Voice
 Brian M. Cassidy and Melanie Shatzky – Francine
 Jason Cortlund and Julia Halperin – Now, Forager
 Antonio Méndez Esparza – Aquí y allá
| style="vertical-align:top; width:50%;"| 
 Emayatzy Corinealdi – Middle of Nowhere as Ruby
 Mike Birbiglia – Sleepwalk with Me as Matt Pandamiglio
 Thure Lindhardt – Keep the Lights On as Erik Rothman
 Melanie Lynskey – Hello I Must Be Going as Amy Minsky
 Quvenzhané Wallis – Beasts of the Southern Wild as Hushpuppy
|-
| style="vertical-align:top; width:50%;"| 
 Artifact
 Beasts of the Southern Wild
 Burn
 The Invisible War
 Once in a Lullaby: PS 22 Chorus Story
| style="vertical-align:top; width:50%;"|
 An Oversimplification of Her Beauty
 Kid-Thing
 Red Flag
 Sun Don't Shine
 Tiger Tail in Blue
|-
| colspan="2" style="vertical-align:top;"| 
 Your Sister's Sister – Emily Blunt, Rosemarie DeWitt, and Mark Duplass Bernie – Jack Black, Shirley MacLaine, and Matthew McConaughey
 Moonrise Kingdom – Bob Balaban, Jared Gilman, Kara Hayward, Frances McDormand, Bill Murray, Edward Norton, Jason Schwartzman, Tilda Swinton, and Bruce Willis
 Safety Not Guaranteed – Kristen Bell, Jenica Bergere, Mark Duplass, Jeff Garlin, Jake Johnson, Aubrey Plaza, Mary Lynn Rajskub, and Karan Soni
 Silver Linings Playbook – Bradley Cooper, Robert De Niro, Anupam Kher, Jennifer Lawrence, Chris Tucker, and Jacki Weaver
|}

Special awards
Spotlight on Women Filmmakers "Live the Dream" Grant
  Stacie Passon – Concussion
 Leah Meyerhoff – I Believe in Unicorns
 Visra Vichit Vadakan – Karaoke Girl

Gotham Tributes
 Marion Cotillard
 Matt Damon
 David O. Russell
 Jeff Skoll

References

External links
 

2012 film awards
2012